Joejuan Lamont Williams (born December 6, 1997) is an American football cornerback for the New England Patriots of the National Football League (NFL). He played college football at Vanderbilt.

Early years
Williams attended Father Ryan High School in Nashville, Tennessee for his first three years of high school before transferring to Hendersonville High School in Hendersonville, Tennessee for his senior year, but was ruled ineligible after his hardship request was denied. As a four-star prospect, Williams received offers from dozens of programs, including Alabama, Oklahoma, Penn State, Ohio State, and Georgia. He ultimately committed to Vanderbilt University to play college football.

College career
Williams played at Vanderbilt from 2016 to 2018. After his junior season in 2018, he entered the 2019 NFL Draft. During his career, he had 119 tackles and four interceptions.

College statistics

Professional career

Williams was selected by the New England Patriots in the second round (45th overall) of the 2019 NFL Draft. He was the sixth cornerback selected.

Williams was placed on injured reserve on August 16, 2022.

References

External links
Vanderbilt Commodores bio

Patriots Profile

1997 births
Living people
Players of American football from Nashville, Tennessee
American football cornerbacks
Vanderbilt Commodores football players
New England Patriots players